Kirrane is an Irish surname. Notable people with the surname include:

 Danny Kirrane, British actor
 Jack Kirrane (1928–2016), American ice hockey player

Surnames of Irish origin